Lars Lilja (born 1954) is a Swedish social democratic politician who has been a member of the Riksdag between 1995–1998 and since 2001.

References
Lars Lilja (S) 

1954 births
Living people
Members of the Riksdag from the Social Democrats
Members of the Riksdag 2002–2006
Place of birth missing (living people)
Date of birth missing (living people)
Members of the Riksdag 2006–2010